The Great Show is a 2019 South Korean television series starring Song Seung-heon, Lee Sun-bin, and Lim Ju-hwan. It aired on tvN on Mondays and Tuesdays at 21:30 (KST) from August 26 to October 15, 2019.

Synopsis
Wi Dae-han (Song Seung-heon) is a former politician who took in a young girl and her three siblings when their mother died. Together, they grew as a family and put on 'the great show' for him to become a politician again. Jung Soo-hyun (Lee Sun-bin) is his junior in college and a current affairs writer with a sense of justice.

Cast

Main
 Song Seung-heon as Wi Dae-han
 Lee Do-hyun as young Dae-han (ep. 1–3)
 Kim Gun-woo as child Dae-han
 Lee Sun-bin as Jung Soo-hyun
 Lim Ju-hwan as Kang Joon-ho

Supporting

People around Wi Dae-han
 Noh Jeong-eui as Han Da-jung
 Jung Joon-won as Han Tak
 Kim Joon as Han Tae-poong
 Park Ye-na as Han Song-yi
 Han Sang-hyuk as Choi Jung-woo
 Yoo Seung-mok as Wi Dae-han's father (ep. 1, 3)
 Choi Su-rin as Dae-han's stepmother

People around Jung Soo-hyun
 Lee Won-jong as Jung Jong-chul
 Kim Hyun as Yang Mi-sook
 Kang Eun-ah as Jung Ji-hyun

People around Kang Joon-ho
 Son Byong-ho as  Kang Kyung-hoon
 Woo Hyun-joo as Park Soo-ji

Political and Media people
 Kim Dong-young as Ko Bong-joo
 Lee Jin-kwon as Loan Shark
 Park Ha-na as Kim Hye-jin
 Yoo Sung-joo as Jung Han-soo
 Yoo Jang-young as PD Koo
 Song Ji-hyun as Writer Ahn
 Pyo Hye-rim as Writer Ma

Original soundtrack

Part 1

Part 2

Part 3

Part 4

Viewership

International broadcast
In the Philippines, ABS-CBN acquired the rights to broadcast The Great Show in Filipino dubbed. The official trailer was released on January 14, 2023. It premiered on Kapamilya Channel's Primetime Bida weeknight block, A2Z Primetime and TV5's Todo Max Primetime Singko weeknight block  on Mondays to Fridays at 22:15 (PST) on February 14, replacing Ever Night: War of Brilliant Splendours, with streaming via iWantTFC.

Notes

References

External links
  
 
 

TVN (South Korean TV channel) television dramas
Korean-language television shows
2019 South Korean television series debuts
2019 South Korean television series endings
Television series by Studio Dragon
Television series by Studio Santa Claus Entertainment